Cicada is a 2011 album by American blues/folk/world fusion/jazz band Hazmat Modine. The album was released on May 17, 2011 by Barbès Records, almost five years after their debut album, Bahamut.

Beninese musical ensemble Gangbé Brass Band features on two tracks; Natalie Merchant and the Kronos Quartet feature on one each.

Track listing
All songs written by Wade Schuman except as noted

Personnel

Magloire Ahouandjinou: Trumpet, vocals
Martial Ahouandjinou: Trombone, vocals
Benoît Avihoue: Percussion, vocals
Bill Barrett: Chromatic harmonica, vocals
Alexis Bloom: Vocals
Elaine Caswell: Vocals
Joseph Daley: Sousaphone, tuba
Athanase Dehoumon: Flugelhorn, vocals
Hank Dutt: Viola
Steve Elson: Clarinet, contra-alto clarinet, piccolo, baritone saxophone, soprano saxophone, tenor saxophone
Michael Farkas: Handclapping, vocals
Alexander Fedoriouk: Cimbalom
Pam Fleming: Trumpet
Lucien Gbaguidi: Saxophone, vocals
Michael Gomez: Balalaika, electric mandocello, guitar, resonator guitar, lap steel guitar, shamisen
David Harrington: Violin
Richard Livingston Huntley: Drums, gong, log drums, talking drum
Crespin Kpitiki: Percussion, vocals
Scott Lehrer: Vocals
Natalie Merchant: Vocals
Eric Della Penna: Guitar, handclapping, vocals
Reut Regev: Trombone
Catherine Russell: Vocals
Wade Schuman: Guitar, handclapping, vocals
John Sherba: Violin
Pete Smith: Guitar, vocals
James Vodounnon: Sousaphone, vocals
Eric Yovogan: Trumpet, vocals
Jeffrey Zeigler: Cello

Reception
Cicada received positive reviews from critics. Robin Denselow, writing for The Guardian, gave the album four out of five stars. Calling it "a brave and unexpected record", he was complimentary of several tracks but singled out the collaborations with Gangbé Brass Band, Natalie Merchant, and the Kronos Quartet as highlights. In another four-star review, All About Jazz praised the band's eclectic makeup and concluded, "Even if Cicada doesn't surpass the novelty or the awards of the group's debut, Bahamut, it is a CD of spectacular aural aurora; one that brings an authentic, multi-referenced, American approach to the concept of world music."

Bill Lupoletti, host of the "Global a Go-Go" program on WRIR public radio, called Cicada a "brilliant album", highlighting "Child of a Blind Man", "I've Been Lonely for So Long", "Walking Stick", "So Glad", and "Dead Crow" as the album's best tracks. Allmusic's William Ruhlmann considered Cicada more "traditional jazz" than Bahamut, while still calling the band's sound "an eclectic mixture of roots styles that is nearly beyond category".

References

External links

2011 albums
Hazmat Modine albums